The following articles contain lists of number-one albums:

 List of number-one albums in Argentina
 List of number-one albums in Australia
 List of number-one albums (Finland)
 List of number-one albums in Greece
 List of number-one albums (Ireland)
 List of number-one albums (Japan)
 List of number-one albums (Mexico)
 List of number-one albums (New Zealand)
 List of number-one albums in Norway
 List of number-one albums (Poland)
 List of UK Albums Chart number ones
 List of Billboard 200 number-one albums

Other 
 List of number-one Billboard Top Latin Albums
 List of number-one country albums (United States)
 List of number-one country albums (Canada)

See also 
 Lists of number-one songs